Lycée Moulay Rachid ("Moulay Rachid High School";) is a coeducational senior high school/sixth-form college in the Al Ouchak area of Tangier, Morocco, named after Prince Moulay Rachid. It was first established in 1975 as the Collège 3ème arrondissement.  the school had 1,400 students, with 770 being girls and 630 being boys, as well as 70 teachers. Aujourd'hui le Maroc described it as a prestigious secondary institution.

References

Schools in Tangier
1975 establishments in Morocco
Educational institutions established in 1975
20th-century architecture in Morocco